Benestare is a comune (municipality) in the Province of Reggio Calabria in the Italian region Calabria, located about  southwest of Catanzaro and about  east of Reggio Calabria.

References

External links
 Official website

Cities and towns in Calabria